Manning House may refer to:

One of three main buildings housing the University of Sydney Union in Sydney, Australia
Florida House on Capitol Hill in Washington, D.C.
Manning House, the former mayoral mansion in Tucson, Arizona design by Henry Trost
Manning House (Andover, Massachusetts), an 18th-century colonial residence